Synclera tenuivittalis is a moth in the family Crambidae. It was described by Turati in 1934. It is found in Libya.

References

Moths described in 1934
Spilomelinae